Edward Bushel may refer to:

Edward Bushel, juror in Bushel's Case
Edward Bushel, allegedly husband of Mary Seymour, daughter of Catherine Parr, Henry VIII's sixth wife